The 1994 NCAA Division I men's lacrosse tournament was the 24th annual Division I NCAA Men's Lacrosse Championship tournament. Twelve NCAA Division I college men's lacrosse teams met after having played their way through a regular season, and for some, a conference tournament.

The championship game was played at Maryland's Byrd Stadium in front of 24,730 fans,  The game saw the Princeton University defeat University of Virginia by the score of 9–8, with Kevin Lowe, brother of Hall-of-Fame lacrosse player Darren Lowe, converting Jeff MacBean's pass 42 seconds into overtime.

This was Princeton's second NCAA national championship under Head Coach Bill Tierney.

Tournament results 

 *  =  Overtime

Tournament boxscores

Tournament Finals

Tournament Semi-finals

Tournament Quarterfinals

 

Tournament First Round

All-Tournament Team

Scott Bacigalupo, Princeton (Named the tournament's Most Outstanding Player)

References

External links 
YouTube 1994 NCAA Men's Lacrosse National Championship

NCAA Division I Men's Lacrosse Championship
NCAA Division I Men's Lacrosse Championship
NCAA Division I Men's Lacrosse Championship
NCAA Division I Men's Lacrosse Championship